Salkhan Soren was an Indian politician and a prominent leader in movement for separate state of Jharkhand. Soren was a member of the Jharkhand Mukti Morcha. Soren was a member of the Jharkhand Legislative Assembly from the Gandey constituency in Giridih district in 1985, 1990, 2000 and 2005. Soren died on 19 December 2016.

References 

2016 deaths
People from Giridih district
Bihar MLAs 1985–1990
Bihar MLAs 1990–1995
Jharkhand MLAs 2000–2005
Jharkhand MLAs 2005–2009
Jharkhand Mukti Morcha politicians
Year of birth missing
Santali people
Adivasi politicians